Television is the most popular medium in Russia, with 74% of the population watching national television channels routinely and 59% routinely watching regional channels. There are 3300 television channels in total. Before going digital television, 3 channels have a nationwide outreach (over 90% coverage of the Russian territory): Channel One, Russia-1 and NTV.

History 

Between 1941 and 1945 all television broadcasts in the nation were interrupted because of Nazi Germany's invasion of the Soviet Union. During these early years, most television programs were about life in the Soviet Union, cultural activities and sports.

In 1956 a second national television channel was established. This initial expansion of activity encompassed mostly the city of Moscow, but to a lesser extent also Leningrad, the Urals, Siberia and the Ukrainian SSR. Each republic, area or region had its own television station.

In the 1970s and 1980s, television become the preeminent mass medium. In 1988 approximately 75 million households owned television sets, and an estimated 93 percent of the population watched television. Moscow, the base from which most of the television stations broadcast, transmitted some 90 percent of the country's programs, with the help of more than 350 stations and nearly 1,400 relay facilities.

Updating the television in the Soviet Union, the release of its censorship by the Central Committee, began with the proclamation at the XXVII Congress of the new General Secretary Mikhail Gorbachev's new political course of the party in relation to the country. Chairman of the Radio and Television was Alexander Aksenov.

In 1991, the Soviet era Gosteleradio state system included six national television channels, 52 stations in the former Soviet republics and 78 regional stations in the Russian Federation.

Today there are about 15,000 transmitters in the country. Development of domestic digital TV transmitters, led within "Multichannel" research program, had already been finished. New domestic digital transmitters have been developed and installed in Nizhniy Novgorod and Saint Petersburg in 2001–2002.

Legislation
The Russian Constitution was adopted by national referendum on December 12, 1993. Article 29 "On the Rights and Freedoms of the Person and Citizen" establishes the universal right to freedom of thought and opinion, freedom of expression of beliefs and convictions, and freedom to seek, receive, transmit, produce and disseminate information. This right can be limited only by law and only "in the interests of protecting the Constitution, morality, health, rights and lawful interests of other persons, or for the defence of the country and national security". According to the Constitution, only the law can limit freedom of speech and establish limits for its expression. The fundamental piece of media-specific federal legislation is the Law on Mass Media, which was passed on December 27, 1991 and took effect on February 13, 1992.

The law reinforces the freedom of information and the unacceptability of censorship. It also contains provisions regulating the founding, ownership and use of mass media, and dissemination of information. The law regulates relations between mass media and citizens and/or organisations, determines the rights and obligations of journalists and establishes responsibility for violations of mass media-related laws. The Law on Mass Media allows private broadcasting and limits the rights of foreign individuals to found mass media in Russia.

Satellite television 
The first Soviet communication satellite, called Molniya, was launched in 1965. By November, 1967 the national system of satellite television, called Orbita was deployed. The system consisted of 3 highly elliptical Molniya satellites, with Moscow-based ground uplink facilities and about 20 downlink stations, located in cities and towns of remote regions of Siberia and the Far East. Each station had a 12-meter receiving parabolic antenna and transmitters for re-broadcasting TV signals to local householders.

However, a large part of the Soviet central regions were still not covered by transponders of Molniya satellites.
By 1976 Soviet engineers developed a relatively simple and inexpensive system of satellite television (especially for Central and Northern Siberia). It included geostationary satellites called Ekran equipped with powerful 300-watt UHF transponders, a broadcasting uplink station and various simple receiving stations located in various towns and villages of Siberia. The typical receiving station, also called Ekran,  included a home-use analog satellite receiver equipped with a simple Yagi-Uda antenna. Later, Ekran satellites were replaced by more advanced Ekran-M series satellites.

In 1979 Soviet engineers developed the Moskva (or Moscow) system of broadcasting and delivering of  TV signals via satellites. New types of geostationary communication satellites, called Gorizont, were launched. They were equipped with powerful onboard transponders, so the size of the receiving station's parabolic antennas were reduced to 4 and 2.5 meters (in comparison to the early 12- meter dishes of the standard orbital downlink stations).

By 1989 an improved version of the Moskva system, called Moskva Global'naya, (or Moscow Global) was introduced. The system included a few geostationary Gorizont and Express type communication satellites. TV signals from Moscow Global's satellites could be received in any country on the planet except Canada and the Northwest USA.

Modern Russian satellite broadcasting services are based on powerful geostationary satellite buses such as Gals (satellite), Ekspress, USP and Eutelsat which provide a large quantity of free-to-air television channels to millions of householders. Pay-TV is growing in popularity amongst Russian TV viewers. The NTV Russia news company, owned by Gazprom, broadcasts the NTV Plus package to 560,000 households, reaching over 1.5 million viewers.

Six out of these seven satellites are new vehicles. Four belong to the "Express-AM" family (sent into orbit in 2003-2005), and two to the "Express-A" family (sent into orbit in 2000-2002). SESC also uses the centre for TV/Radio signal compression standard along with the formation of data transport flows as per the MPEG-2/DVB standard, which ensures the formation of standardized signal packages from federal TV/radio channels.

By May 2013, of the 53 million TV homes in Russia, 24% were equipped for Direct-to-Home satellite reception, making satellite the country's leading platform for digital television. The number of satellite homes across Russia continues to grow, increasing by 25% between 2011 and 2013 from 8 million to 12.6 million. 10% of these homes receive signals from more than one satellite position, taking the total number of antennas to 13.8 million.

Cable television
Cable television was introduced in the 2000s, and grew significantly in the early 2010s. Cable operators began upgrading their networks to DVB-C and adding new services such as video on demand, catch-up-TV and others. In 2012, cable television accounted for more than half of all pay-TV subscribers (58%). Most of Pay-TV channels were closed due to 2022 Russian invasion of Ukraine due to the fact that they were non-Government owned.

Distribution of the terrestrial channels
The distribution of the terrestrial channels is the task of the Unitary Enterprise Russian Satellite Communications Company, which has 11 satellites, and the Federal Unitary Enterprise "Russian TV and Radio Broadcasting Network" serving 14,478 TV transmitters in Russia (90.9% of the total number). TV and radio channels are broadcast through the terrestrial satellite communications complexes owned by the Russian Satellite Communications Company at teleports located in Medvezhy Ozera, Vladimir and Dubna, which ensure the transmission of channels to all five time zones in Russia via the space vehicles of RTRN.

Digital broadcasting
Different alternatives were considered in the process of preparing proposals on shifting the country to digital broadcasting (thematic discussions began in the early 2000s), but the Ministry of IT and Communication decided to focus solely on terrestrial broadcasting as the method of digital TV implementation. In Russia, the first legal act to set the standards for the digital transition was the Government Resolution No. 1700-r of 29 November 2007, which approved a Concept Paper for the Development of TV and Radio Broadcasting in the Russian Federation in 2008–2015. This document was elaborated by the high-level Governmental Commission on Development of TV and Radio Broadcasting originally headed by Dmitry Medvedev in his capacity as first vice-chair of the government.

Internet TV
Russian TV is available to many expatriates living abroad, via the internet. There are several OTT service providers, which are targeted on Russian and Ukrainian expatriates in the United States and Canada.

Beginning
In December 2005, a project was launched to create a digital television network in the Republic of Mordovia, where the DVB-T standard will be utilised. The project objective was to ensure for the population, the possibility of receiving a large (up to 10) number of TV channels and several radio stations in the stereo broadcasting mode and in the digital DVB-T standard. The project was implemented by OJSC "Volga Telecom" (a subsidiary of OJSC "Sviazinvest") with support from the Ministry of Information Technologies and Communication of Russia, the Ministry of Culture, the National Association of TV Broadcasters and administration of the Republic of Mordovia.

The transition of terrestrial TV from analogue into digital format (in DVB-T standard) has been announced as a government priority in Russia and identified in the document Concept of TV Broadcasting Development in the Russian Federation within 2008–2015. The main positive factor in the introduction of terrestrial TV broadcasting in the DVB-T standard, according to the opinion of market players, has been the approval of a TV broadcasting development framework in the Russian Federation for 2008-2015 (approved by resolution of the RF Government # 1700-p, dated 29 November 2007).

The total investment in the transition of terrestrial TV from analogue to digital format is expected to be Euro 10 billion during the period 2008–2015.

The main factors which have a high positive influence upon the rates of terrestrial DTV introduction tend to be general political and macroeconomic factors. Commercial factors do not have a significant influence upon rates of introduction of digital standards for terrestrial broadcasting. Cable television would gain the largest financial benefits from the introduction of digital television.

On May 10 during Sviaz-Expocomm – 2011, the 23rd International Exhibition of Information Technologies and Communication Services in Moscow, Russia's national telecommunications operator Svyazinvest, together with Russian Television and Radio Broadcasting Network signed a cooperation agreement to organize the terrestrial transmission of digital content to the RRBN transmitters across the country, thus enabling the broadcasting of eight federal TV channels (Channel One, Russia 1, Russia 24, Russia 2, Russia K, Channel 5, NTV, Karusel) and one local channel, the latter to be transmitted as a "multiplex" channel on one of the main digital channels.

In June 2011 DVB-T2 tests got under way in Moscow. In July 2011 The Russian government commission on the development of TV and radio broadcasting, has supported the Communications and Mass Media Ministry's suggestion to roll out DVB-T2 test zones, the government's press service has announced.

In September 2011 a governmental commission had approved the use of the DVB-T2 standard for the development of digital terrestrial TV in Russia, as proposed by the Ministry of Communications. The digital terrestrial TV network is currently being tested out in the Tver region. According to the plan, new regional networks will be deployed under the DVB-T2 standard and existing DVB-T networks will be upgraded to the new standard

List of channels 
This is a list of television channels that broadcast in Russia.  Full list of channels

State-owned

Private

Discontinued

Most-viewed channels
Weekly viewing shares, 28 November – 4 December 2022:

See also

 List of Russian language television channels
 Television in the Soviet Union
 1HDTV

References

External links

 
Television
Russia